Zalman Shazar (born Shneur Zalman Rubashov; ; ; November 24, 1889 – October 5, 1974) was an Israeli politician, author and poet. Shazar served as the third President of Israel for two terms, from 1963 to 1973.

Biography
He was born to a Hasidic family of the Chabad-Lubavitch denomination in Mir, near Minsk, in the Russian Empire (today in Hrodna Voblast, Belarus). His mother's family descended from Joel Sirkis. In his early years Shazar received a religious education.

He remained involved with Chabad for the rest of his life, assisting Rabbi Yosef Yitzchok Schneersohn, the sixth Lubavitcher Rebbe in founding the village of Kfar Chabad, and at his behest, allowed the religious community in Israel to set up their own educational system. He later corresponded with the seventh Lubavitcher Rebbe Menachem Mendel Schneerson, and visited him on multiple occasions.

In his teenage years he became involved in the Poale Zion Movement. He worked as a translator in a Zionist publishing house. He visited Palestine in 1911 but returned to Russia to serve in the army. In 1924, after his release, he immigrated to the British Mandate of Palestine, settling in Tel Aviv, and became a member of the secretariat of the Histadrut.

Shazar was married to Rachel Katznelson-Shazar, with whom he had one daughter.

He died on October 5, 1974 and was buried on Mount Herzl in Jerusalem.

Journalistic and political career

Shazar served as the editor-in-chief of the Israeli newspaper Davar from 1944 to 1949.

He was elected to the first Knesset in 1949 as a member of Mapai, and was appointed Minister of Education in David Ben-Gurion's first government. He was not a member of Ben-Gurion's second cabinet, but retained his seat in the 1951 and 1955 elections. He also became a member of the Jewish Agency Executive in 1952. He resigned from the Knesset in 1956, and from 1956 to 1960 was acting chairman of the Jewish Agency's Jerusalem Executive.

President of the State of Israel
Shazar was elected president by the Knesset in 1963. That same year, he attended the funeral of John F. Kennedy after his assassination in Dallas. In 1964, when Pope Paul VI visited Israel, Shazar read to him the verse in Micah stating that though other nations might follow other gods, “we will walk in the Name of our Lord God forever”. He was re-elected for a second term in 1968.

In 1969, Shazar sent one of 73 Apollo 11 Goodwill Messages to NASA for the historic first lunar landing. The message still rests on the lunar surface today. It states, "From the President of Israel in Jerusalem with hope for 'abundance of peace so long as the Moon endureth' (Psalms 72,7)." In 1973 he was succeeded by Ephraim Katzir.

International and state visits
During his presidency Shazar made numerous international trips and state visits:
  - Funeral of President John F. Kennedy (1963), Funeral of President Dwight Eisenhower (1969), state visit and meeting with President Richard Nixon (1971), memorial service to President Harry Truman (1973), State Funeral of Lyndon B. Johnson (1973)
  - Funeral of Prime Minister Winston Churchill (1965)
  - State visit and meeting with King Mahendra of Nepal (1966)
  - State visit and meeting with President Alberto Héber Usher (1966)
  - State visit and meeting with President Eduardo Frei Montalva (1966)
  - State visit and meeting with President Humberto de Alencar Castelo Branco (1966)
  - Centennial celebrations and meetings with Governor General Roland Michener and Prime Minister Lester Pearson (1967)
  - Funeral of King Frederick IX of Denmark (1972)

Published works
Morning Stars, Jewish Publication Society of America: Philadelphia, 1967. Translated from the Hebrew, Kochvei boker (Tel Aviv: Am Oved Publishers, 1950; 7th edition, 1966) by Shulamith Schwartz Nardi. Library of Congress Card Catalog Number: 66-17828.

Awards and recognition
 In 1966, Shazar was the co-recipient (jointly with Israel Efrat) of the Bialik Prize for literature.
 Shazar's portrait appears on 200 shekel bills.
 Zalman Shazar Junior High School in Kfar Saba is named after him.

See also
List of Bialik Prize recipients

References

External links
The Zalman Shazar Center
Central Zionist Archives in Jerusalem site: Office of Zalman Shazar (S61).

1889 births
1974 deaths
People from Karelichy District
People from Novogrudsky Uyezd
Jews from the Russian Empire
Belarusian Hasidim
Polish emigrants to Mandatory Palestine
Israeli Hasidim
Chabad-Lubavitch Hasidim
Ashkenazi Jews in Mandatory Palestine
Israeli people of Belarusian-Jewish descent
Mapai politicians
Presidents of Israel
Ministers of Education of Israel
Heads of the Jewish Agency for Israel
Members of the Assembly of Representatives (Mandatory Palestine)
Members of the 1st Knesset (1949–1951)
Members of the 2nd Knesset (1951–1955)
Members of the 3rd Knesset (1955–1959)
Yiddish-language poets
Burials at Mount Herzl
People from Mir, Belarus